Seth Parusnath (born 30 August 1994) is a South African soccer player who plays as a midfielder for Sekhukhune United.

References

1994 births
Living people
Soccer players from Durban
South African soccer players
Association football midfielders
Lamontville Golden Arrows F.C. players
Sekhukhune United F.C. players
South African Premier Division players
National First Division players